Global Chillage is the second album by the Irresistible Force. It was released in 1994.

Critical reception

The Times called the album a classic of the ambient genre, writing that "it may sound random, but [the] gently drifting patchworks of synthesized sound and percussion have careful structures that leave little to chance." The Orange County Register concluded that "except for 'Sunstroke' and 'Waveform', the seven tracks here (most of which clock in at around 10 minutes) come across as random noises."

Track listing

Personnel 
Jon Black – design
Adrian Harrow – engineering
Chris Levine – cover art
Mixmaster Morris – instruments, arrangement, production
Nimbus – mastering

References

External links 
 

1994 albums
The Irresistible Force albums